Arbetarbladet ('The Workers' Newspaper') is a social democratic newspaper published in Gävle, Sweden.

History and profile
The first issue of Arbetarbladet was published on 14 March 1902. The paper is published in tabloid format.

Fredrik Ström was the editor-in-chief of the newspaper during the period of 1908-1910. Karl August Fagerholm was the editor-in-chief between 1934 and 1942. Kennet Lutti was the editor-in-chief of the newspaper several years from 1994. Today Helena Nyman is the editor-in-chief. She took over after Daniel Nordström.

In 2006 the newspaper had a daily edition of 26,100 copies. Its circulation was 21,600 copies in 2011. The circulation of the paper was 20,800 copies in 2012 and 19,500 copies in 2013.

References

External links
Official website

1902 establishments in Sweden
Publications established in 1902
Daily newspapers published in Sweden
Swedish-language newspapers
Socialist newspapers
Mass media in Gävle